Shinn (formerly, Shinn Station) is a former unincorporated community, now incorporated into Fremont in Alameda County, California.

The Shinn area is bounded approximately by Peralta Blvd to the south and Niles to the north and forms the northern part of the Parkmont district of Fremont.  In the Shinn area is the Shinn Pond and the Shinn Historic Park and Arboretum, where the Shinn house still stands.  The Shinn family ran a nursery, importing trees from throughout the Pacific Rim in the 1850s. This large Victorian Shinn house still reflects the family's humble Quaker origins and ambitious pursuits. The home's interior has high ceilings and is adorned with Victorian-era fixtures. But from the original brown wallpaper in the dining room to the shelves of books in the study, it is hardly ostentatious.  Their lawn was essentially an advertisement for the nursery business. Today the arboretum includes several trees that range in age from 130 to 150 years old, including a Moreton Bay Fig from Australia, a Belota from Chile and a ginkgo from China.

References

 

Neighborhoods in Fremont, California